András Szőllősy (27 February 1921 in Orăştie – 6 December 2007 in Budapest) was the creator of the Szőllősy index (abbreviated "Sz."), a frequently used index of the works of Hungarian composer Béla Bartók.

Szőllősy studied composition under Zoltán Kodály at the Franz Liszt Academy of Music where he was a professor of music history and theory from 1950 until his death. He was awarded a Ph.D. from the University of Budapest.

He won numerous prizes and awards for his own compositions, including Distinguished Composition of the Year 1970 at UNESCO's International Rostrum of Composers in Paris for Concerto No. 3 for sixteen strings, and the 1971 Erkel Prize. In 1985 he won the Kossuth Prize – the highest official recognition of the Hungarian state – and in 1987 he was proclaimed Commandeur of the Ordre des Arts et des Lettres by the French government. He became a member of the Széchenyi Academy of Literature and Arts in 1993 and was awarded the Széchenyi Prize in 1997.

Szöllősy's musicological writings include books on Bartók, Kodály, and Arthur Honegger. The Szőllősy index includes all of Bartók's compositions as well as his musicological writings. For instance, Concerto for Orchestra is Sz. 116 and Music for Strings, Percussion and Celesta is Sz. 106.

External links
 . Former G. Ricordi website (accessed 19 December 2013).

1921 births
2007 deaths
People from Orăștie
Franz Liszt Academy of Music alumni
Hungarian composers
Hungarian male composers
International Rostrum of Composers prize-winners
Eötvös Loránd University alumni
20th-century Hungarian male musicians